Vetus Latina manuscripts are handwritten copies of the earliest Latin translations of the Bible (including the Hebrew Bible/Old Testament, the Deuterocanonical books and the New Testament), known as the "Vetus Latina" or "Old Latin". They originated from multiple translators, and differ from Vulgate manuscripts which follow the late-4th-century Latin translation by Jerome.

Vetus Latina and Vulgate manuscripts continued to be copied alongside each other until the Late Middle Ages; many copies of the Bible or parts of it have been found using a mixture of Vetus Latina and Vulgate readings.

Studies 

Textual critics such as the Cambridge scholars Alan 
 Brooke, Norman McLean and Henry S. J. Thackeray (1906–1935, 8 volumes) have used the blackletter  (𝕷) as a sign (known as a siglum) for categorising Vetus Latina manuscripts. David L. Everson (2014) used "" (an abbreviation of "Old Latin") as siglum instead.

In 1949, the Vetus-Latina-Institut of Beuron Archabbey introduced a new numerical system for Vetus Latina manuscripts, of which there are several hundreds altogether. These Beuron numbers are designed to provide unambiguous identification of witnesses in academic usage, yet they are not used very widely in general literature, as they may cause confusion with the Greek minuscule manuscripts.

The Vetus-Latina-Institut allocated numbers up to 99 to all existing Vetus Latina manuscripts of the New Testament, depending on what parts of NT they include, and how old their text is. The lowest numbers are allocated to the gospels, and to the most complete manuscripts. For example, Codex Sangermanensis (g) is a witness for the Gospel of Matthew and sparingly in the remaining gospels (Gosp), and four Old Testament Books, and as it is a full manuscript of the Bible is allocated number 7.

 Manuscripts 1-49 are witnesses to one or more Gospels.
 Manuscripts 50-74 are witnesses to Acts, General epistles or the Book of Revelation (Rev).
 Manuscripts 75-89 are witnesses to Pauline epistles (Paul).
 Manuscripts 91-96 are glosses in Spanish Bibles.

From Beuron no. #100 onwards, most Vetus Latina manuscripts are of the Old Testament, the Psalter, and the Apocrypha. There is occasional overlap between them, for example Old Testament glosses found in Spanish Bibles, or when a manuscript contains both Old and New Testament texts.

Old Testament 
 Dates are estimated to the nearest 50 year increment.
 Beu indicates the number of the manuscript according to the Beuron system of the Vetus-Latina-Institut.
Unless specified otherwise, details in the below taken from Fitzmyer, Tobit.

Editions

New Testament 

The table below employs the following conventions.
 Dates are estimated to the nearest 50-year increment (but 'first half of 5th century' = '425', 'second half of 5th century' = '475').
 Content is given to the nearest book (or sometimes chapter); verses and lacunae are not listed.
 Editions are those consulted by UBS4; in many cases, better editions are also available.
 Locations are given in anglicised form, unless linked to sources in other languages.
 Manuscripts will sometimes be referred to as "it" followed by the siglum.
 Beu indicates the number of the manuscript according to the Beuron system of the Vetus-Latina-Institut.
Unless specified otherwise, details taken from Piggin, The Original Beuron Numbers of 1949.

Editions 
by editor

For precision, publication data is given in the language of the title page of the edition. To make this information comprehensible to the English language reader, links are provided to English language article titles, where necessary and possible.

When a single editor is responsible for more than one edition, these are listed in alphabetical order of the sigla of the relevant manuscripts. In such cases, if the manuscript is not readily identifiable from the title, its name (siglum and number) are appended after the citation.

 Buchanan, Edgar S. The Epistles and Apocalypse from the Codex Harleianus. Sacred Latin Texts 1. London, 1912.
 Buchanan, Edgar S. The Four Gospels from the Codex Corbeiensis, together with fragments of the Catholic Epistles, of the Acts and of the Apocalypse from the Fleury Palimpsest. Old Latin Biblical Texts 5. Oxford, 1907. [Codex Floriacensis (h 55)]
 Bruyne, Donatien de. Les Fragments de Freising— épitres de S. Paul et épttres catholiques. Collectanea Biblica Latina 5. Rome, 1921. 
 Fischer, Bonifatius. Ein neuer Zeuge zum westlichen Text der Apostelgeschichte. Pages 33–63 in J. Neville Birdsall and R.W. Thomson (eds). Biblical and Patristic Studies in Memory of Robert Pierce Casey. Freiburg im Breisgau: Verlag Herder, 1963. 
 Frede, HJ. Altlateinische Paulus-Handschriften. Freiburg im Breisgau: Verlag Herder, 1964. 
 Gwynn, John. Liber Ardmachanus: The Book of Armagh. Dublin, 1913.
 Jülicher, Adolf, Walter Matzkow and Kurt Aland (eds). Itala: Das Neue Testament in altlateinischer Überliefung. 4 volumes [Matthew–John]. Berlin: Walter de Gruyter and Company, 1938–1972. 
 Matthaei, C. F., Novum Testamentum, XII, tomis distinctum Graece et Latine. Textum denuo recensuit, varias lectiones nunquam antea vulgatas ex centum codicibus MSS.... 12 volumes. Rigae, 1782-1788. 
 Matthaei, C. F., Novum Testamentum, XIII. Epistolarum Pauli Codex Graecus cum versione Latino veteri vulgo Antehieronymiana olim Buernerianus nunc Bibliothecae Electoralis Dresdeiisis ... Lipsiae, 1791. 
 Morin, Germain. . .  [Codex Schlettstadtensis (r 57)]
 Morin, Germain. Liber Comicus sive Lectionarius missae quo Toletana Ecclesia ante annos mille et ducentos utebatur. Anecdota Maredsolana 1. Marodsoli, 1893. 
 Sanders, HA. 'The Text of Acts in Ms. 146 of the University of Michigan'. Proceedings of the American Philosophical Society 77 (1937): –.
 de:Schultze, Victor. Codex Waldeccensis. München, 1904.
 Scrivener, FHA. An Exact Transcript of the Codex Augiensis. Cambridge and London, 1859.
 Souter, Alexander. Miscellanea Ehrle 1. Studi e Testi 137. Roma, 1924.
 Tischendorf, Constantin von. Codex Claromontanus. Lipsiae, 1852.
 Tischendorf, Constantin von. Codex Laudianus, sive Actus apostolorum Graeces et Latine. Monumenta sacra inedita, nova collectio 9. Lipsiae, 1870.
 Tischendorf, Constantin von. Anecdota Sacra et Profana. Editio repetita, emendata, aucta. Lipsiae, 1861. [Codex Guelferbytanus (gue 79)]
 White, Henry Julian. Portions of the Acts of the Apostles, of the Epistles of St. James, and of the First Epistle of St. Peter from the Bobbio Palimpsest. Old Latin Biblical Texts 4. Oxford: The Clarendon Press, 1897.

See also 
 Lists of New Testament manuscripts
 Septuagint manuscripts
 Vulgate manuscripts
 List of Hebrew Bible manuscripts

References

Sources

Further reading 

 
 
 Sabatier, Pierre.  Bibliorum Sacrorum Latinae Versiones antiquae seu Vetus Italica. Remis, 1743. 3 vol (I, II, III; three tomes in-folio).
 Gryson, Roger.  Altlateinische Handschriften/Manuscrits Vieux Latins 1-275 Vetus Latina 1/2A. Freiburg im Breisgau: Verlag Herder, 1999.
 Gryson, Roger.  Altlateinische Handschriften/Manuscrits Vieux Latins 300-485 Vetus Latina 1/2B. Freiburg im Breisgau: Verlag Herder, 2004.
 Fischer, Bonifatius.  'Varianten zu Matthäus'. In Vetus Latina: Aus der Geschichte der lateinischen Bibel 13. Freiburg im Breisgau: Verlag Herder, 1988.
 Fischer, Bonifatius.  'Varianten zu Markus'. In Vetus Latina: Aus der Geschichte der lateinischen Bibel 15. Freiburg im Breisgau: Verlag Herder, 1989.
 Fischer, Bonifatius.  'Varianten zu Lukas'. In Vetus Latina: Aus der Geschichte der lateinischen Bibel 17. Freiburg im Breisgau: Verlag Herder, 1990.
 Fischer, Bonifatius.  'Varianten zu Johannes'. In Vetus Latina: Aus der Geschichte der lateinischen Bibel 18. Freiburg im Breisgau: Verlag Herder, 1991.

External links 

published in print

 Elliott, James Keith.  A Bibliography of Greek New Testament Manuscripts. 2nd edition. Society for the Study of the New Testament Monograph Series 109. Cambridge University Press, 2000. 
 Elliott, James Keith.  'Translations of the New Testament into Latin'. In Widmen Dieses and others (eds). Aufstieg und Niedergang der römischen Welt (ANRW) II.26.1: 198-245. Berlin: Walter de Gruyter, 1997.
 Elliott, James Keith.  'Old Latin Manuscripts in Printed Editions of the Greek New Testament'. Novum Testamentum 26 (1984): 225–248.
 Lasala, Fernando de.  Paleografia Latina: Trascrizioni, commenti e tavole. 2nd revised and expanded edition. Rome: Pontifical Gregorian University Press, 2001.

published on web

 Vetus Latina Iohannes  — edited by PH Burton, J. Balserak, Hugh AG Houghton and DC Parker, The Verbum Project.
 Vetus Latina: Die Reste der altlateinischen Bibel   — unter der Leitung von Roger Gryson, Vetus Latina Institute, Beuron Archabbey.
 VetusLatina.org  — edited by Hugh AG Houghton, Institute for Textual Scholarship and Electronic Editing, University of Birmingham.
 
Lists of New Testament manuscripts
Textual scholarship